François Autain (16 June 1935 – 21 December 2019) was a French politician. Over his career, he was a member of the Communist, Republican, and Citizen Group and a member of the Left Party, prior to which he was a member of the Citizen and Republican Movement but also the PS and the PSU.

He was a member of the Senate of France, representing the Loire-Atlantique department from 1983 to 2011 and a deputy in the National Assembly from 1978 to 1981.  From 1981 to 1983, he served as a secretary of state in the governments of Pierre Mauroy in the Ministry of Solidarity and Heath and the Ministry of Defense.

Biography
François Autain was born on 16 June 1935 in the commune of Luché-sur-Brioux in the Deux-Sèvres department.  He studied medicine in Nantes and became active in the Union Nationale des Étudiants de France during the Algerian War.  He became a general practitioner in Bouguenais, a commune near Nantes.  In 1968, he joined the Unified Socialist Party.

In 1971, he was elected as mayor of Bouguenais, a position that he held until 1993.  He joined the Socialist Party in 1975 and won election to the National Assembly in the 1978 French legislative election.  As a physician, he focused on health issues in the Assembly. After the victory of François Mitterrand in the 1981 French presidential election, Autain joined the government as a Secretary of State, or junior minister.  He served in government until 1983, when he was elected as a Senator.

Autain served in the Senate until 2011, having been re-elected in 1992 and 2001. He was a secretary of the senate as well as a quaestor, a role that gave him access to government funds that he could distribute to mayors of communes.  The party removed him from its official list in 2001; however, he was able to win re-election in the 2001 French Senate Election as a member of the Citizen and Republican Movement.  He later left the Citizen and Republican Movement and joined the Left Party formed by Jean-Luc Mélenchon.

He did not stand as a candidate for re-election in 2011.

References 

 Page on the Senate website

1935 births
2019 deaths
People from Deux-Sèvres
Politicians from Nouvelle-Aquitaine
Unified Socialist Party (France) politicians
Socialist Party (France) politicians
Citizen and Republican Movement politicians
Left Party (France) politicians
Deputies of the 6th National Assembly of the French Fifth Republic
Deputies of the 7th National Assembly of the French Fifth Republic
French Senators of the Fifth Republic
Senators of Loire-Atlantique
Mayors of places in Pays de la Loire